Frank Hatton (31 August 1861 – 1 March 1883) was an English geologist and explorer, who died young from an accidental shooting in the Bornean jungle. He was the second child of the journalist Joseph Hatton (1839–1907), who wrote a biographical preface to the book on North Borneo published posthumously based on field notes.

Biography
Frank was born at Horfield near Bristol and was educated at Marcy, near Lille in France and later King's College School. He went to study at the Royal School of Mines in London where he won the Frankland prize of the Institute of Chemistry. With a keen interest in the study of geology, he joined the British North Borneo Company as a mineral explorer and set off on his first expedition, leaving London in August 1881. He reached Labuan in October and Abai in November. He explored the Sequati and Kurina rivers before recouping at Singapore and in the summer of 1882 he visited the Labuk river followed by Kinoram district. The official explanation was that he was killed when his gun, tangled in the forest, went off while he was pursuing an elephant. Frank had been extremely interested in exploration, with a knowledge of local dialects and well read on the works of earlier explorers. After his death, his body was brought by several days of canoe journey on the Kinabatangan River to Elopura. An enquiry pointed to accidental death and he was buried at Sandakan cemetery.

Frank's publications included a note on The Adventures of a Drop of Thames Water to the Whitehall Review and two papers- On the Action of Bacteria on Various Gases, and On the Influence of Intermittent Filtration through Sand and Spongy Iron on Animal and Vegetable Matters dissolved in Water, and the Reduction of Nitrates by savage and other agents.

References

External links 
 The strange death of British explorer Frank Hatton in North Borneo by Patricia Hului (Kajomag: September 3, 2019)

1861 births
1883 deaths
19th-century British geologists
English explorers